Midori is a lightweight JavaScript library. It is intended to make JavaScript web development easier. It was created by Aycan Gulez and hasn't been updated since June 2010. The website was down in November 2018, then since August 2019, it turned into various unrelated Japanese websites.

Features 

 DOM element selection using CSS selectors
 Tabs
 Drag and Drop
 Effects
 Pop-up menus
 Ajax with history support
 Autocomplete
 Inline Edit
 Table row selection
 DOM, cookie, form, string and array utility methods

Use 

midori consists of 10 modules and is available as a single JavaScript file. It can be included within any web page by using the following markup:
<script type="text/javascript" src="path/to/midori.js"></script>

midori allows the use of standard CSS syntax to access DOM elements, and supports most CSS2 and CSS3 selectors. There are three ways to work on returned DOM elements.

 Passing JavaScript code to modify a single property, using the built-in apply() method:
// Sets the background color of all the cells in even rows to "yellow" in the "cities" table
midori.get('#cities tr:nth-child(even) td').apply('style.backgroundColor = "yellow"');

 Passing a function that takes a single parameter for more complex operations, again using the apply() method: 
// Marks the cells whose values are 12 or bigger in the "cities" table
midori.get('#cities td').apply(function (o) {
  if (parseInt(o.innerHTML) >= 12) o.style.backgroundColor = 'red';
});

 Directly accessing array entries returned by midori.get() is also possible.
// Returns the first div element
var firstDiv = midori.get('div')[0];

See also 

 JavaScript framework
 JavaScript library

References

External links
 Official website
 Documentation
 Tutorials

JavaScript libraries
Software using the MIT license
JavaScript web frameworks